Maxwell David "Max" Hooper (20 January 1926 – 19 November 2000) was a member of the Queensland Legislative Assembly.

Biography
Hooper was born in Townsville, Queensland, the son of Archibald David Hooper and his wife Ada Beatrice (née Carron). He was educated at the  Central State Primary School in Townsville before attending the Townsville Grammar School. He joined the RAAF in February 1945, towards the end of World War II, and was discharged in September of the same year while still in training. He was then a Motel Owner/Operator and land developer in Townsville from 1947 until 1972.

On the 21 February 1953 Hooper married Beryl Palm Cook and together had two sons and two daughters. He died in Brisbane in November 2000.

Public life
Hooper, representing the National Party, won the seat of Townsville West at the 1974 Queensland state elections, defeating Labor leader Perc Tucker in his own seat. He held the seat for six years, being defeated by Geoff Smith in 1980. He was the Minister for Maritime Services and Tourism from August 1979 until his defeat a year later.

He was an alderman in the Townsville City Council from 1971–1972 and then he was elected Mayor of Townsville from 1972 until 1976.

References

Members of the Queensland Legislative Assembly
1926 births
2000 deaths
National Party of Australia members of the Parliament of Queensland
20th-century Australian politicians
Mayors of Townsville
Royal Australian Air Force personnel of World War II